Megachile verrucosa is a species of bee in the family Megachilidae. It was described by Juan Brèthes in 1910.

References

Verrucosa
Insects described in 1910
Taxa named by Juan Brèthes